Hollie Doyle (born 11 October 1996) is a British jockey who competes in flat racing. She set a new record for winners ridden in a British season by a female jockey in 2019. The following year, she came fourth in the Flat Jockeys' Championship, the highest result for a woman to date. She came third in the BBC Sports Personality of the Year Award 2020, and was also named The Sunday Times sportswoman of the year. In June 2022 she became the first female jockey to win a French Classic and the first British female jockey to win a European Classic when she rode Nashwa to victory in the Prix de Diane (French Oaks) at Chantilly.

Background 

Doyle comes from a racing background. Her father Mark Doyle, from Clonmel, is a former jockey and her mother Caroline rode in Arab horse races. The family lived in Herefordshire and had point-to-pointers and ponies at home. Doyle was a member of the Radnorshire & West Herefordshire Pony Club and rode her first pony race at the age of nine. She had her first ride under rules as an amateur rider on The Mongoose at Salisbury in May 2013, winning by half a length. After taking her GCSEs in 2013, she joined the training yard of David Evans in Wales. That winter she spent six weeks riding trackwork in Santa Anita Park in Arcadia, California.

Career 

Doyle moved as an apprentice jockey to the Wiltshire yard of trainer Richard Hannon in 2014 and rode out her claim in November 2017. Her first win in a Listed race came on Billesdon Bess in the August 2017 Upavon Fillies' Stakes at Salisbury while still an apprentice. In June 2018 Doyle was unseated in a race at Haydock and suffered facial injuries including the loss of several teeth. She returned to race riding after 10 days.  

In 2019 Doyle set a new record for winners ridden in a calendar year in Britain by a female jockey with 116 victories, passing the previous record of 106 winners set by Josephine Gordon in 2017. Doyle's first win at Royal Ascot came in June 2020 when she steered 33/1 chance Scarlet Dragon to victory in the Duke of Edinburgh Stakes.

Doyle rode her first Group race winner on 9 July 2020 on Dame Malliot in the Princess of Wales's Stakes on the July Course at Newmarket. In the same month she was appointed as a retained jockey for owner Imad Al Sagar, and in August won the Rose of Lancaster Stakes on Extra Elusive for her new retainer. It was Doyle's second Group race win. On 29 August 2020 Doyle rode five winners in one day at Windsor Racecourse, making her the first female jockey to win five races on the same card in Britain. On 14 October 2020 Doyle rode her 117th winner of the season, breaking the female jockeys' record she set in 2019.

On 17 October 2020, Doyle became the first female jockey to ride a winner on Champions Day at Ascot, when she steered Trueshan to victory in the Long Distance Cup. This was followed by her first Group 1, winning the Champions Sprint on Glen Shiel. Doyle finished the season fourth in the Flat Jockeys' Championship, the highest-ever ranking for a woman. In early November, she made her debut at the Breeders' Cup, riding Mighty Gurkha in the Breeders' Cup Juvenile Turf Sprint and getting her first ride for Aidan O'Brien on the undercard. 

Doyle secured another five-timer, this time at Kempton Park, on 3 March 2021. She had her first opportunity to ride in a Classic race in the 2021 2000 Guineas, but her mount, outsider Albadri, reared up and fell on leaving the paddock and was withdrawn from the race. Another opportunity came when she was given the ride on Sherbet Lemon in the 2021 Oaks. Sherbert Lemon, a 28/1 outsider, finished ninth of 14 runners, a record placing for a female jockey in a British Classic race.

Doyle secured her second Group 1 victory on 27 July 2021 when she won the Goodwood Cup on 6/5 favourite Trueshan. She won the next two races to complete a 123-1 treble.
 On 11 September 2021, she rode the Aidan O'Brien trained Interpretation into fourth place in the St Leger Stakes at Doncaster, becoming the first female jockey to be placed in the prize money in a British Classic. 

In September 2021 Doyle was given a seven-day ban for careless riding in a race at Kempton Park. The ban meant she missed a ride on Trueshan in the Prix du Cadran at Longchamp. James Doyle was given the ride and won the race. Doyle rode her 152nd winner of the year on 22 October, surpassing her own record for a British female jockey of 151 wins in 2020.

On 3 June 2022 Doyle rode Nashwa, bred and owned by Al Sagar and trained by John and Thady Gosden, into third place in the Oaks, a record for a female jockey in a British Classic. On 19 June 2022 Nashwa started 3/1 favourite for the Prix de Diane (French Oaks) at Chantilly. Doyle rode her to a narrow victory, becoming the first female jockey to win a European Group 1 Classic.

On 16 January 2023, Doyle suffered a fractured elbow and ruptured ligaments after her mount The Perfect Crown suffered a fatal injury and broke down during a race at Wolverhampton.

Awards

In 2019 Doyle was awarded a Lester for lady jockey of the year. In December 2020 she was named The Sunday Times sportswoman of the year. Later that month she took third place in the BBC Sports Personality of the Year Award, and was awarded three Lesters including flat jockey of the year. In February 2022 she again won the female jockey of the year Lester award.

Personal life 

Doyle's husband is jockey Tom Marquand. The couple met in their Pony Club days, and they were for a time apprentices together at Richard Hannon's yard. They became engaged in 2020 and married on 21 March 2022 in the parish church of the village of Ivington in Herefordshire.

Major wins

 Great Britain
 British Champions Sprint Stakes - (1) - Glen Shiel (2020)
 Goodwood Cup - (1)  Trueshan (2021) 
 Nassau Stakes - (1)  Nashwa (2022)

 France
 Prix de Diane - (1)  Nashwa (2022) Prix de l'Abbaye de Longchamp - (1) The Platinum Queen (2022)''

Notes

References 

1996 births
Living people
British female jockeys
Lester Award winners
English jockeys